Shastri River is a river in Ratnagiri district of Maharashtra. It originates near Prachitgad, flows near Sangameshwar and meets Arabian sea near Jaigad Fort.

References 

Rivers of Maharashtra
Rivers of the Western Ghats
Ratnagiri district